Unbound may refer to:

Arts, entertainment, and media

Music
Unbound, formerly the name of Deathbound, a four-piece death metal band from Vaasa, Finland
Unbound, an album by Merciless, 1994
"Unbound", a song by Ásgeir Trausti, 2017
"Unbound (The Wild Ride)", a song by Avenged Sevenfold on the album Avenged Sevenfold
Unbound 01, an EP by Keshia Chanté, 2017

Other arts, entertainment, and media
Unbound (book), a 2010 narrative nonfiction book by author Dean King
Doctor Who Unbound, series of audio plays in an alternative universe for Doctor Who
 Frankenstein Unbound, a movie by Roger Corman based on a book by Brian Aldiss
 Unbound: An Interactive Journal of Christian Social Justice, an online journal published by the Advisory Committee on Social Witness Policy of the Presbyterian Mission Agency
 Need for Speed: Unbound

Brands and enterprises
Unbound (publisher), a crowd-funded publishing company
 The Unbound Collection by Hyatt, a division of Hyatt hotels

Organizations
Unbound (nonprofit organization), a nonprofit sponsorship organization headquartered in Kansas City to serve the poor
Unbound Project, a project celebrating female animal advocates, founded by Jo-Anne McArthur and Keri Cronin

Science, technology, and mathematics 

Unbound (DNS server), a validating, recursive, and caching DNS server
In physics and chemistry; see bound state, binding energy

See also
Unbound morpheme
Unbound variable
Boundedness (disambiguation)